The 6th Infantry Division is a military formation of the Korean People's Army Ground Force.

PLA
The 166th Division was created in November 1948 under the Regulation of the Redesignations of All Organizations and Units of the Army, issued by Central Military Commission on November 1, 1948, basing on the 4th Independent Division, PLA Northeastern Field Army. The 166th Division was a Korean unit, composing of mostly Korean officers and soldiers.

The division was under control of Northeastern Military District. Under the flag of 166th division it took part in the Chinese Civil War. In July 1949, the division was disbanded, and all its 10620 Korean officers and soldiers moved to North Korea, where it was re-organized as 6th Division of the Korean People's Army. 

As of its disbandment the division was composed of:
496th Regiment;
497th Regiment;
498th Regiment.

KPA
The date that the 6th Infantry Division was formed in somewhat unclear as the Army during the Korean War believed that the 6th ID was established either in July 1949 or March 1950. It is believed the division was formed at Sinuiju from 10,000 Chinese Communist Army personnel of Korean descent from the 166th Division who had been "repatriated" in late 1949 together with the former 1st Regiment of the 1st Division. The Korea Institute of Military History indicates that the division was established in October 1949. All sources indicate that the unit was initially composed of the 13th Infantry Regiment, 14th and 15th Infantry Regiments, and the 6th Artillery Regiment.

The 6th Infantry Division took part in the opening moves of the North Korean invasion of South Korea, moving against the ROKA 1st Division on June 25, 1950. After suffering heavy casualties in the Inchon area, this division met no opposition in its move down the west coast. This unit had sustained heavy casualties in its attempts to take Masan, but its morale and combat effectiveness was still considered good. Was part of the North Korean advance from Seoul to Taejon. Fought in the Battle of Pusan Perimeter.

Currently the 6th Infantry Division is located along the DMZ near the village of Panmunjom.  It is believed to consist almost entirely of a light infantry force but has been task organized with an attached T-62 or T-64 main battle tank battalion.  It is reportedly part of II Corps (North Korea).  In the event of another Korean War this division is likely tasked with seizing a foothold across the Imjin River in order to allow follow on forces to continue south.

References

中国人民解放军各步兵师沿革，http://blog.sina.com.cn/s/blog_a3f74a990101cp1q.html

Infantry divisions of the People's Liberation Army
Military units and formations established in 1948
Military units and formations disestablished in 1949
InfDiv0006
InfDiv0006NK
Military units and formations established in 1949